Kento Miyaura (宮浦 健人, born 22 February 1999) is a Japanese male volleyball player from Kumamoto City, on the island of Kyushu. Currently, he plays in PlusLiga for PSG Stal Nysa. He used to be the captain of Japan U-19 national team and Waseda University's club.

Career

Elementary school years
Miyaura started play volleyball at his second grade of elementary school, he was slender and lacked in power so he got the opportunity to participate in the game until the 4th grade. But he still was a substitute and was told that "You are not an ace".

High school years

Then, in his senior high school years, he was bothered by an injury that forced him to leave the team. In the second year, he was assigned as a captain of the team, but he often caused trouble to the team due to his lack of ability. That was a very  hard time in his volleyball life so he thought about quitting. As time passed, the hardship made him stronger. However, he and the team suffered with 2016 Kumamoto earthquakes which closed their training gym, after a month, they had to find a new training place but the environment was not good. So, the result was the team won the runner-up place at All Japan high school volleyball championship.

College years 
After high school graduation, Miyaura joined Waseda University. He was called for Japan men's national under-19 volleyball team for the first time and later became a captain of the team. In second year, he considered being more stronger in physical term, so he started to do weight training and communicated with the team's staff about injury prevention. Furthermore, he also changed his serving style, from float serve to jump serve, making more effectiveness to the team. In the next year, he became a big server in the team. Miyaura was assigned for being national representative in every junior level, U-19 team and U-21 team in 2017, U-23 and universiade team in 2019, respectively.

In his final year in college, he was a captain and led the team won first in the All Japan Intercollegiate Volleyball Championship, made Waseda university won this tournament 5 years consecutively. Then, in 2020–21 season, he joined JTEKT Stings in V.League 1.

Career and Japan senior national team

2021/22 season
In 2021, he was called up for senior national team for the first time and his first competition as senior is 2021 Asian Men's Volleyball Championship. Japanese team finished as runners-up, he scored total 76 points and received the Best Opposite Spiker award.

On October 15, he played his first full game in V.League as starting line-up against JT Thunders, which JTEKT lost with 1–3 set. He became key player for the team since  helping the team scored and became top scorer in almost every matches.

On January 16, 2022, JTEKT was in the 7th place then, after lost in straight 5 matches, Miyaura helped the team won Toray Arrows with 3–1 set at home. Also, he was a top scorer with 30 points and as the result, he lay down and cried after the win.

JTEKT Stings ended at 7th place in the league. Miyaura was in the 5th place of the top scorers category, the 1st among Japanese, with 651 points after finishing the final stage.

2022/23 season
Miyaura was back-to-back elected as Japanese national team and went to compete in the 2022 FIVB Volleyball Men's Nations League. In the first week, he played as the starting line-up against the United States, which Japan lost in the full set, and he scored 20 points totally. In almost the last match of the third week, Miyaura as the starting 6, showed his abilities by led the team won over Germany with 1–3 set count. He also scored the most of the team by 17 points, including 15 attacks and 2 aces.

On August 2, it was announced that he would be playing for Polish club PSG Stal Nysa in the 2022-2023 season.

Clubs 
   (2015–2018)
  Waseda University (2017–2020)
  JTEKT Stings (2020–2022)
  PSG Stal Nysa (2022–present)

National teams 
 Japan men's national under-19 volleyball team (2017–2018)
 2017 Asian Boys' U19 Volleyball Championship
 2018 Asian Men's U20 Volleyball Championship
 Japan men's national under-21 volleyball team (2017)
 2017 FIVB Volleyball Men's U21 World Championship
 Japan men's national under-23 volleyball team (2019)
 2019 Asian Men's U23 Volleyball Championship
 Japan universiade national team
 2019 Summer Universiade Tournament
 Japan men's national volleyball team (2021–present)

Awards

Individual 
 2017 Asian Boys' U19 Volleyball Championship — MVP
2020 All Japan Intercollegiate Volleyball Championship — MVP
2020 All Japan Intercollegiate Volleyball Championship — Best Server
2021 Asian Men's Volleyball Championship — Best Opposite Spiker
 2021-2022 V.League Division 1 - Fair play award

Club teams 
2020 All Japan Intercollegiate Volleyball Championship —  Champion, with Waseda University
2020-21 the Japanese Emperor's Cup —  Champion, with JTEKT Stings

References

See also 
 List of Waseda University people
 Autumn Kanto University League Match - 宮浦世代になってから初の公式戦！王者の貫禄見せつけ好スタートを切る at wasedasports.com (Japanese)
 MIYAURA HELPS JAPAN GRIND OUT WIN OVER THAILAND at asianvolleyball.net
 早稲田主将・宮浦健人　4連覇がかかった未知数のインカレ「全てを出し尽くす」 at 4years.asahi.com
  at Yahoo! Japan
 「試合に出るには西田有志と勝負しないといけない」バレー宮浦健人（23歳）が覚悟の海外挑戦…控えめな性格に変化？早稲田時代から20キロ増 at Yahoo! Japan

1999 births
Living people
Japanese men's volleyball players
Sportspeople from Kumamoto Prefecture
Waseda University alumni
Opposite hitters
21st-century Japanese people